Jack Andrew MacKenzie (born 4 July 2000) is a Scottish professional footballer who plays for Scottish Premiership club Aberdeen as a defender.

Career
MacKenzie joined Aberdeen aged 9. He was captain of the club's development side and signed a two-year contract in 2019. In March 2020, MacKenzie was due to join Atlanta United 2 on loan, but the move was cancelled due to the COVID-19 pandemic.

In October 2020, MacKenzie joined Scottish League One club Forfar Athletic on loan, going on to make 14 appearances.

MacKenzie made his first team debut for Aberdeen on 20 March 2021, in a Scottish Premiership game against Dundee United under interim manager Paul Sheerin. Following his debut, MacKenzie signed a new two-year contract that is due to run until 2023.

Career statistics

References

2000 births
Living people
Scottish footballers
Aberdeen F.C. players
Scottish Professional Football League players
Association football defenders
Forfar Athletic F.C. players
Footballers from Aberdeen